was a Japanese footballer who played as a forward.

International career
On 23 September 2010, Kudo was selected for the Japan Under-21 squad for the 2010 Asian Games held in Guangzhou, China.

On 23 May 2013, Kudo was called up to Japan's senior team for the first time prior to an international exhibition game against Bulgaria.

Personal life and death
On 11 May 2016, Kudo collided violently with goalkeeper Matt Lampson and suffered a fractured jaw.

Kudo died from complications of brain surgery on 21 October 2022, at the age of 32.

Career statistics

Club

International

Scores and results list Japan's goal tally first, score column indicates score after each Kudo goal.

Honours
Kashiwa Reysol
J. League Division 1: 2011
J. League Division 2: 2010
Emperor's Cup: 2012
Japanese Super Cup: 2012
J. League Cup: 2013
Suruga Bank Championship: 2014

Japan
Asian Games: 2010
EAFF East Asian Cup: 2013

References

External links
 
 
 Japan National Football Team Database
 
 Profile at Sanfrecce Hiroshima 
 Profile at Kashiwa Reysol
 

1990 births
2022 deaths
Association football people from Tokyo
Japanese footballers
Japan international footballers
J1 League players
J2 League players
A-League Men players
Major League Soccer players
Kashiwa Reysol players
Vancouver Whitecaps FC players
Sanfrecce Hiroshima players
Renofa Yamaguchi FC players
Brisbane Roar FC players
Tegevajaro Miyazaki players
Asian Games medalists in football
Footballers at the 2010 Asian Games
Asian Games gold medalists for Japan
Japanese expatriate footballers
Japanese expatriate sportspeople in Australia
Expatriate soccer players in Australia
Association football forwards
Medalists at the 2010 Asian Games
Deaths from complications of brain surgery